Don Mauricio López-Roberts y Terry, Marquess consort of Torrehermosa (Nice, France, 23 January 1873 - Madrid, Spain, 18 February 1940) was a Spanish noble, diplomat and politician.

Works

Narrative
The Triz Garcia, 1902.
The singer, 1902.
The family of Hita, 1902.
The future of Paco Tudela, 1903.
Arnaiz Lino's novel, 1905.
The Sphinx smiles, 1906.
The wagon of Thespis, 1906.
"Las infanzonas", 1907.
A Night of Souls, 1907.
Doña Martyrdom, 1907.
The true home, 1917, Fastenrath Award. 
Old wives tales, 1917.
The jealous, 1918.
The white bird, 1919.
The groom, 1920.

Essay
Poster Art, 1931.

Marquesses of Spain
1873 births
1940 deaths